The Rosslyn Twin Towers are twin office buildings located at 1000 and 1100 Wilson Boulevard in the Rosslyn neighborhood of Arlington, Virginia. They were the tallest buildings in the Washington metropolitan area for three decades until the completion of 1812 N Moore, a block away, in 2013. They remain the tallest twin towers in the region and the commonwealth of Virginia.

The buildings are home to the headquarters of Politico and WJLA-TV, and were formerly home to the headquarters of Gannett Company/USA Today.

The towers are part of a complex that features retail, and televisions and news tickers visible from the nearby intersection. Arlington County approved construction of rooftop decks for each tower in 2015. The project was completed in 2018.

See also
List of tallest buildings in Arlington, Virginia
List of tallest buildings in Virginia
List of tallest twin buildings and structures
Tysons Corner, Virginia is home to twin towers with an identical shape, albeit shorter

References

Buildings and structures in Arlington County, Virginia
Skyscrapers in Virginia
Skyscraper office buildings in Virginia
Twin towers

HOK (firm) buildings
Rosslyn, Virginia